Hollywood Chinese: The Chinese in American Feature Films is a 2007 American documentary film directed by Academy Award-nominated director Arthur Dong.

From early films like the 1900s Beheading the Chinese Prisoner to Ang Lee's triumphant Brokeback Mountain in 2005, Dong uses clips of more than 100 films and interviews of prominent Chinese Americans to create a thorough overview on the depiction of Chinese in mainstream Hollywood films. He hits many major points such as white performers who portray Asians in both The Good Earth and Fu Manchu series, Nancy Kwan's roles in The World of Suzie Wong and Flower Drum Song, Bruce Lee and the emergence of martial arts films and Justin Lin's take on his film Better Luck Tomorrow. People interviewed include Christopher Lee, Wayne Wang, James Hong, Nancy Kwan, Luise Rainer, Amy Tan and B. D. Wong. Dong also spends time talking about his discovery of two reels of the 1916-17 silent film The Curse of Quon Gwon, which is considered to be the first feature film made by an Asian American.

The documentary was also broadcast on PBS on May 27, 2009.

Reviews
On Rotten Tomatoes the film has a score of 100% based on reviews from 10 critics, with an average rating of 7.8/10.

Awards and honors
 2007 Golden Horse Film Awards: Best Documentary
 Henry Hampton Awards winner
 Official selection, Toronto International Film Festival
 Special presentation, AFI Fest, Los Angeles

References

External links
 Website: Hollywood Chinese
 Hollywood Chinese: The Chinese in American Featured Films Film site
 Chung, P. W. (April 11, 2008).The History Of 'Hollywood Chinese', AsianWeek
 

2007 films
American documentary films
Films about Chinese Americans
Films directed by Arthur Dong
Documentary films about Asian Americans
2007 documentary films
Documentary films about Hollywood, Los Angeles
2000s English-language films
2000s American films